"This Heart" is a song written and originally recorded by Gene Redding in 1974. The song was written by the songwriting team of Dennis Lambert and Brian Potter.

"This Heart" was released as a single during the spring of the year, and became a hit in the United States (#24) and Canada (#28). The song also was a U.S. R&B hit.

Chart history

References

External links

1974 songs
1974 singles
Capitol Records singles
Songs written by Brian Potter (musician)
Songs written by Dennis Lambert